John Joseph Billion (March 4, 1939 – February 25, 2023) was an American politician and physician who was the 2006 Democratic Party candidate for Governor of South Dakota and served as a member of the South Dakota House of Representatives from the 13th district from 1993 to 1997.

Early years
John Joseph Billion was born in Sioux Falls, South Dakota, on March 4, 1939. He was the second of eight children of Henry and Evelyn Heinz Billion, and grew up in what is commonly known as the "north end" of Sioux Falls.

Education
Billion attended elementary and high school in Sioux Falls. He graduated from Cathedral High School in 1957. He received his BA degree from Loras College in Dubuque, Iowa and was admitted to the Loyola University Chicago in August 1960. He was awarded his Doctor of Medicine degree in 1964 and began his internship and residency training at St. Francis Hospital in Peoria, Illinois.

Career
After completing his orthopedic residency in 1969, Billion served two years in the United States Air Force as a Major. He returned to Sioux Falls in 1971 to begin his orthopedic surgery practice. He has been active in the Sioux Falls and South Dakota medical communities since that time. Billion practiced as a Board Certified Orthopedic Surgeon from 1971 through 1997.

Political career
In 1992, Billion was elected, along with fellow Democrat Linda Barker, as one of two South Dakota State Representatives from the Sioux Falls-based 13th District. Billion was re-elected in 1994. In 1996, Billion declined to seek a third term in the State House, instead choosing to run for the State Senate from the 13th District. However, he lost to Republican Kermit Staggers by an 876-vote margin. In 2006, Billion re-entered politics and emerged as the Democratic nominee for Governor of South Dakota in 2006. He selected Rapid City historian Eric Abrahamson as his running mate, but was overwhelmingly defeated in the general election by incumbent Republican Governor Mike Rounds.

Personal life
Billion married Linda Lambur in 1962, and they had five children. In 1980, he married his second wife, Deborah, and they had two children. He died at Avera McKennan Hospital in Sioux Falls, South Dakota, on February 25, 2023, at the age of 83.

References

1939 births
2023 deaths
20th-century American physicians
20th-century American politicians
American surgeons
American United Methodists
Loras College alumni
Loyola University Chicago alumni
Democratic Party members of the South Dakota House of Representatives
Politicians from Sioux Falls, South Dakota
Physicians from South Dakota
Military personnel from South Dakota
United States Air Force officers